In computing, the System Management BIOS (SMBIOS) specification defines data structures (and access methods) that can be used to read management information produced by the BIOS of a computer. This eliminates the need for the operating system to probe hardware directly to discover what devices are present in the computer. The SMBIOS specification is produced by the Distributed Management Task Force (DMTF), a non-profit standards development organization. The DMTF estimates that two billion client and server systems implement SMBIOS.
 
The DMTF released the version 3.6.0 of the specification on June 20, 2022.

SMBIOS was originally known as Desktop Management BIOS (DMIBIOS), since it interacted with the Desktop Management Interface (DMI).

History
Version 1 of the Desktop Management BIOS (DMIBIOS) specification was produced by Phoenix Technologies in or before 1996.

Version 2.0 of the Desktop Management BIOS specification was released on March 6, 1996 by American Megatrends (AMI), Award Software, Dell, Intel, Phoenix Technologies, and SystemSoft Corporation. It introduced 16-bit plug-and-play functions used to access the structures from Windows 95.

The last version to be published directly by vendors was 2.3 on August 12, 1998. The authors were American Megatrends, Award Software, Compaq, Dell, Hewlett-Packard, Intel, International Business Machines (IBM), Phoenix Technologies, and SystemSoft Corporation.

Circa 1999, the Distributed Management Task Force (DMTF) took ownership of the specification. The first version published by the DMTF was 2.3.1 on  March 16, 1999. At approximately the same time Microsoft started to require that OEMs and BIOS vendors support the interface/data-set in order to have Microsoft certification.

Version 3.0.0, introduced in February 2015, added a 64-bit entry point, which can coexist with the previously defined 32-bit entry point.

Version 3.4.0 was released in August 2020.

Version 3.5.0 was released in September 2021.

Version 3.6.0 was released in June 2022.

Contents
The SMBIOS table consists of an entry point (two types are defined, 32-bit and 64-bit), and a variable number of structures that describe platform components and features. These structures are occasionally referred to as "tables" or "records" in third-party documentation.

Structure types
As of version 3.3.0, the SMBIOS specification defines the following structure types:

Accessing SMBIOS data
The EFI configuration table (EFI_CONFIGURATION_TABLE) contains entries pointing to the SMBIOS 2 and/or SMBIOS 3 tables. There are several ways to access the data, depending on the platform and operating system.

From UEFI
In the UEFI Shell, the  command can retrieve and display the SMBIOS data. One can often enter the UEFI shell by entering the system firmware settings, and then selecting the shell as a boot option (as opposed to a DVD drive or hard drive).

From Unix
For Linux, FreeBSD, etc., the dmidecode utility can be used.

From Windows
Microsoft specifies WMI as the preferred mechanism for accessing SMBIOS information from Microsoft Windows.

On Windows systems that support it (XP and later), some SMBIOS information can be viewed with either the WMIC utility with 'BIOS'/'MEMORYCHIP'/'BASEBOARD' and similar parameters, or by looking in the Windows Registry under HKLM\HARDWARE\DESCRIPTION\System.

Various software utilities can retrieve raw SMBIOS data, including FirmwareTablesView and AIDA64.

Generating SMBIOS data
Table and structure creation is normally up to the system firmware/BIOS. The UEFI Platform Initialization (PI) specification includes an SMBIOS protocol (EFI_SMBIOS_PROTOCOL) that allows components to submit SMBIOS structures for inclusion, and enables the producer to create the SMBIOS table for a platform.

Platform virtualization software can also generate SMBIOS tables for use inside VMs, for instance QEMU.

If the SMBIOS data is not generated and filled correctly then the machine may behave unexpectedly. For example, a Mini PC that advertises Chassis Information | Type = Tablet may behave unexpectedly using Linux. A desktop manager like GNOME will attempt to monitor a non-existent battery and shut down the screen and network interfaces when the missing battery drops below a threshold. Additionally, if the Chassis Information | Manufacturer is not filled in correctly then work-arounds for the incorrect Type = Tablet problem cannot be applied.

See also
 Web-Based Enterprise Management (WBEM)

References

External links 
 
 SMBIOS Demystified, August 1, 2006, by Kiran Sanjeeva

DMTF standards
BIOS
Computer hardware standards